At the Gates is a Swedish death metal band from Gothenburg, formed in 1990. The band was a major progenitor of Gothenburg-style melodic death metal alongside In Flames and Dark Tranquillity. Prior to their first disbandment in 1996, At the Gates released four albums, ending with and including Slaughter of the Soul (1995), which has been seen as a landmark in the mid-1990s Swedish death metal scene. After reuniting for a one-off tour in 2008, the band reformed once again in 2011, and they have since released three more albums: At War with Reality (2014), To Drink from the Night Itself (2018) and The Nightmare of Being (2021).

History

Early career (1990–1994)
At the Gates were formed in late 1990 by former members of the death and black metal band Grotesque. They recorded a debut EP, Gardens of Grief, for the Dolores record label. The EP led the label Peaceville Records to sign the band, and they released their debut album, The Red in the Sky Is Ours in 1992.

After the recording of their second studio album, With Fear I Kiss the Burning Darkness, founding member and guitarist Alf Svensson left the band in 1993, to pursue tattoo artistry, graphic novel illustration and his solo electronic-opera-black metal project, Oxiplegatz. He was soon replaced by former House of Usher guitarist Martin Larsson, who the band knew from underground tape trading. The band continued touring Europe, and were filmed for a Headbangers Ball special feature in Nottingham, England in July 1993.

Success and breakthrough (1994–1996)
In 1994, At the Gates released their third album, Terminal Spirit Disease, which was hailed as a breakthrough album.

The band continued touring and in 1995 released their most commercially and critically successful album: Slaughter of the Soul, on Earache Records. The album is regarded as their strongest death metal effort, compared to previous albums. This album firmly rooted the band as one of the leaders of the Swedish metal scene, the "Gothenburg sound" of melodic death metal. The band received international attention for the album, gaining them several U.S. tours and heavy rotation of the music video for "Blinded by Fear" on MTV in the United States, but despite this international success, the Björler brothers departed in 1996. The remaining members decided it would be impossible to continue without them, so the band broke up.

Post-breakup (1996–2007)
When At the Gates broke up in 1996, drummer Adrian Erlandsson, bassist Jonas Björler, and guitarist Anders Björler formed The Haunted. Tomas Lindberg went on working with different bands including Skitsystem, The Crown, Lock Up, and Nightrage. Erlandsson left in 1999 to join Cradle of Filth. In 2001, Peaceville Records released an At the Gates retrospective called Suicidal Final Art.

Reunion (2007–2008)

On 18 October 2007, At the Gates announced several reunion shows for mid-2008, including Getafe Electric Festival, Roskilde Festival, Ruisrock, Wacken Open Air, Graspop Metal Meeting, Sweden Rock Festival, Gods of Metal, Hellfest Summer Open Air and Bloodstock Open Air, as well as a tour of Japan with The Dillinger Escape Plan, Into Eternity, Pig Destroyer, and Mayhem in May 2008. Throughout July 2008, they toured the US and Canada on what was dubbed the "Suicidal Final Tour", and played their final UK show at Bloodstock Open Air on Sunday on 17 August 2008. They finished their last show in Athens, Greece, with guest The Ocean on 21 September 2008. The band's performance at Wacken Open Air in 2008 is available on The Flames of the End DVD boxed set, which also includes clips of songs from other venues and a documentary that covers the history of the band in its entirety.

At War with Reality (2014–2016)

On 21 January 2014, At the Gates released a video on YouTube showing a distorted video with lines of text on it, followed by text saying "2014", possibly hinting toward possible lyrics for an upcoming album. On 27 January, the band revealed on Facebook via a new cover photo and profile picture, that their confirmed fifth record would be titled At War with Reality and would be released in the fall of 2014 through Century Media.

When asked whether At War with Reality is At the Gates' final album or if the band will continue recording, Tomas Lindberg replied, "We can't say really. We have no plans of stopping but we've broken promises before so it's best not to say anything." In numerous recent interviews members of the band have expressed interest in doing a follow-up album. At the Gates concluded the touring cycle for At War with Reality in August 2016 with a festival appearance at Elb Riot in Hamburg, Germany.

To Drink from the Night Itself and The Nightmare of Being (2017–present) 
On 8 March 2017, in an official statement released by the band, they announced that Anders Björler had departed from the band. Despite Anders' departure, they went on to confirm that they were working on a follow-up to 2014's At War with Reality, which they were aiming to record and release in 2018. In September 2017, Jonas Stålhammar was announced as the new guitarist to take the place of Björler on a permanent basis, but he had joined too late to be involved in the writing process of the new album. They entered the studio to begin recording the album in November 2017, titled To Drink from the Night Itself, which was released through Century Media Records on 18 May 2018.

At the Gates released their seventh studio album, The Nightmare of Being, on 2 July 2021. While the album remains rooted in the Gothenburg metal tradition, it also features a wider range of musical styles, influences, and instrumentation. The ideas in the album are influenced by the writings of horror philosophers such as Thomas Ligotti and Eugene Thacker.

On 23 July 2022, At the Gates announced the departure of Stålhammar. On 5 October, the band announced that original guitarist Anders Björler had rejoined the band. They are now working on their 8th studio album following the return of Björler.

Musical style and legacy 
At the Gates' musical style has been described as melodic death metal and death metal. The band's early work presented a "progressive, complex way of crafting songs of dextrous[sic] melodic fluidity and variation", which would influence progressive death metal, but also the black metal of Darkthrone's Transilvanian Hunger, for instance. Most of this material was composed by Alf Svensson, who, according to guitarist Anders Björler, fused the Swedish melancholy of Nordic folk music with death metal and classical music.

The style of later At the Gates "would inspire the whole Gothenburg region", but as Svensson had left the band, the commercial breakthrough Slaughter of the Soul was composed of more traditional song structures: "[...] a stripped-down, no-frills melodic death album that hit all the basic points of the style".

Awards
At the Gates were nominated for a Swedish Grammy (Grammis) for Slaughter of the Soul in 1996, but didn't win.
They won the Swedish Grammy (Grammis) in February 2015 for the 2014 comeback album At War with Reality.
The band were also awarded the Metal Hammer Golden Gods Inspiration Award in June 2015.

Members

Current members
 Tomas Lindberg − vocals (1990–1996, 2007–2008, 2010–present)
 Adrian Erlandsson − drums (1990–1996, 2007–2008, 2010–present)
 Anders Björler − lead guitar (1990–1996, 2007–2008, 2010–2017, 2022–present)
 Jonas Björler − bass (1990–1992, 1993–1996, 2007–2008, 2010–present), drums (1990)
 Martin Larsson − rhythm guitar (1993–1996, 2007–2008, 2010–present)

Former members
Alf Svensson − rhythm guitar (1990–1993)
Björn Mankner − bass (1990)
Cliff Lundberg − bass (1992)
Jonas Stålhammar − lead guitar (2017−2022)

Session and touring musicians
 Jesper Jarold − violin (1991–1992)
 Tony Andersson − bass (1992)
 Dirk Verbeuren – drums (2019)
 Ola Englund – bass (2019)
 Patrik Jensen – lead guitar (2022)
 Daniel Martinez – lead guitar (2022)

Timeline

Discography

Studio albums
 The Red in the Sky Is Ours (1992)
 With Fear I Kiss the Burning Darkness (1993)
 Terminal Spirit Disease (1994)
 Slaughter of the Soul (1995)
 At War with Reality (2014)
 To Drink from the Night Itself (2018)
 The Nightmare of Being (2021)

References

External links

Earache Records artists
Musical groups established in 1990
Musical groups disestablished in 1996
Musical groups disestablished in 2008
Musical groups reestablished in 2007
Musical groups reestablished in 2010
Swedish melodic death metal musical groups
Articles which contain graphical timelines
Musical quintets
Swedish heavy metal musical groups